Tyrone Brazelton (born March 30, 1986) is an American professional basketball player who last played for Levski Sofia of the NBL. He plays at the point guard position. He won a Polish Championship in 2009 with the club Prokom. On October 2, 2016 Brazelton won the Polish Super-Cup and was named the MVP.

College career 
Born in Chicago, Illinois, Brazelton initially played basketball for the Rich East High School, but transferred to the rival Rich Central High School during his senior year. He led the latter team to a championship in the Big Dipper tournament and was named as the most valuable player of the tournament.

After graduation, Brazelton played for the Missouri State University-West Plains basketball team, transferring to the Western Kentucky University basketball team his junior year. Missouri State University-West Plains participated in the NJCAA sports and Western Kentucky – in NCAA Division I sports. He led the latter team in double–digit scoring figures during his junior and senior years of college, making the All-Sun Belt Second Team at the end of his senior year.

Brazelton went undrafted at the 2008 NBA Draft. He then played with the Utah Jazz's NBA Summer League team, appearing in two games and averaging 12 points, 3 rebounds and 2 assists per game.

Professional career 
Failing to impress the NBA scouts, Brazelton moved to Europe and signed with a Latvian team BK Ventspils playing in the EuroChallenge tournament. Although he led the team from the very start, his efforts were not enough to carry the team to the Top 16 phase of the tournament. Shortly after the tournament loss to Cajasol Sevilla, Brazelton moved to Asseco Prokom. Playing in the Euroleague, he averaged 3.7 points, 1.5 rebounds and 1.7 assists per game, shooting 26% from the field. In August 2009, he re-signed with Prokom for one more season. He was released from the team in November 2009.

In January 2011, he moved to Germany and played for Eisbären Bremerhaven.

During the 2011–12 season, Brazelton played in the NBA Development League with Erie BayHawks. He averaged 9.2 points, 2.3 rebounds and 5.3 assists per game, playing 29 minutes a game and shooting 39% from the field.

In August 2012, Brazelton once again moved to Germany and signed with Nürnberger BC. In November, he moved to BC Odessa of Ukraine.

In April 2013, he signed with the Iranian club Petrochimi. In August, he moved to the Lithuanian club BC Nevėžis. In January 2014, he signed with the Belorussian team Tsmoki-Minsk. In April 2014, he returned to Lithuania and signed with BC Neptūnas for the rest of the season.

In August 2014, he signed a one-year deal with STB Le Havre of the French LNB Pro A.

On July 2, 2015, Brazelton signed a two-year deal with Torku Konyaspor of the Turkish Basketball Super League. In December 2015, he parted ways with Konyaspor after averaging 10.7 points and 5 assists per game. On December 19, 2015, he signed with a two-year contract with BCM Gravelines of the LNB Pro A. At the end of the 2015–16 season, he parted ways with Gravelines.

On July 26, 2016, Brazelton signed with Polish club Rosa Radom for the 2016–17 season. On April 18, 2017, he signed Guizhou of China for the 2017 NBL season.

On October 29, 2017, Brazeltone signed with Istanbulspor Beylikduzu of the Turkish Basketball First League.

In February 2018, Brazelton moved to Panionios in Greece and then spent the entire 2018–2019 season with Ifaistos Limnou, averaging 9.2 points, 2.3 rebounds and 4.3 assists in 24 games. On August 5, 2019, Brazelton signed with his third Greek Basket League club, Kolossos Rodou.

The Basketball Tournament
In 2017, Brazelton played for the Kentucky Kings of The Basketball Tournament. Brazelton scored 6.5 PPG to help his team make it to the second round. The Basketball Tournament is a winner-take-all tournament broadcast on ESPN with a winning purse of $2 million.

References

External links 
 RealGM profile
 Euroleague.net profile

1986 births
Living people
African-American basketball players
American expatriate basketball people in China
American expatriate basketball people in France
American expatriate basketball people in Germany
American expatriate basketball people in Greece
American expatriate basketball people in Iran
American expatriate basketball people in Latvia
American expatriate basketball people in Lithuania
American expatriate basketball people in Poland
American expatriate basketball people in Turkey
American expatriate basketball people in Ukraine
American men's basketball players
Asseco Gdynia players
Basketball players from Chicago
BCM Gravelines players
BC Neptūnas players
BC Nevėžis players
BC Odesa players
BC Tsmoki-Minsk players
BK Ventspils players
Czarni Słupsk players
Eisbären Bremerhaven players
Erie BayHawks (2008–2017) players
Ifaistos Limnou B.C. players
Junior college men's basketball players in the United States
Kolossos Rodou B.C. players
Nürnberg Falcons BC players
Panionios B.C. players
Petrochimi Bandar Imam BC players
Point guards
Rosa Radom players
STB Le Havre players
Torku Konyaspor B.K. players
Western Kentucky Hilltoppers basketball players
21st-century African-American sportspeople
20th-century African-American people